NS3, NS 3, NS-3, NS.3 or variation, may refer to:

Transportation
 Bukit Gombak MRT station (station code: NS3), Bukit Batok, Singapore
 Takiyama Station (station code: NS03), Kawanishi, Hyōgo Prefecture, Japan
 Kamonomiya Station (Saitama), station code: NS03; Kita-ku, Saitama, Japan
 RAF N.S. 3, a British NS class airship
 New Shepard 3, a Blue Origin reusable space launch vehicle booster rocket (booster #3)
 Blue Origin NS-3, a 2016 January 22 Blue Origin suborbital spaceflight mission for the New Shepard

Other uses
 Argyle-Barrington (constituency N.S. 03), Nova Scotia, Canada
 NS3 (HCV), hepatitis C virus non-structural protein 3
 Novelty seeking level 3, extravagance
 Netscape Navigator 3.0; a webbroswer
 ns (simulator), version ns-3, computer network simulation software

See also

 NSSS (disambiguation)
 NS (disambiguation)
 3 (disambiguation)